Roy Calvin Green (born June 30, 1957) is an American former professional football player who was a wide receiver in the National Football League (NFL). He played for the St. Louis/Phoenix Cardinals (1979-1990) and Philadelphia Eagles (1991–1992).

Early life
Green was born in Magnolia, Arkansas.

College career
Green played college football at Henderson State University.
He played defensive back and returned kicks for Henderson State University, and achieved All-American status.

Professional career
Green was drafted by the Cardinals in the fourth round of the 1979 NFL Draft. He starred as a rookie returning kicks, including a 106-yard return for a touchdown against the Dallas Cowboys, tying an NFL record. Green also played well at cornerback. In 1981, he stepped in as wide receiver part-time and managed to gain 708 yards on merely 33 catches, which equated to nearly 21.5 yards per catch. On September 20 against the Washington Redskins, he caught a touchdown pass and recorded an interception. This made him the first player since Eddie Sutton in 1957 to do both in the same game. Green did this twice more that year against the Dallas Cowboys and Washington. The following season, Green fully transitioned to wide receiver and performed well in the strike-shortened season. Green truly shined during the next several seasons, particularly in 1984 when his 1,555 receiving yards were then the third highest in a season (through the 2005 season, this has since dropped to eighteenth). Green led the Cardinals in receiving in 1983, 1984 and 1988 (during those intervening years, veterans Pat Tilley and J. T. Smith split time leading the team in receiving). He was usually one of the few stars on a mediocre team. During his career, the Cardinals only made the playoffs once, in the strike-shortened 1982 season, and would only garner winning records two other times.

Green played with the Cardinals past their move to Phoenix, Arizona in 1987. He caught 68 passes in 1988 for 1,097 yards with seven touchdowns for his third and final 1,000-yard season in 1988. The following year saw him play in just twelve games and catch 44 passes for 703 yards with seven touchdowns. Green caught 53 passes in the 1990 season that got him to 500 career receptions, which as of the end of that season saw just 24 other players with as many receptions. On June 9, 1991, he was traded to the Cleveland Browns for an undisclosed draft pick. On August 20, 1991, he was cut from the team when the Browns reduced their roster to sixty and elected to keep rookie Michael Jackson and Reggie Langhorne instead. Green was subsequently signed by the Philadelphia Eagles, who sought veteran leadership at wide receiver to replace the retired Mike Quick and the waived Cris Carter. Green played much of that season, in which a lackluster offense was balanced by a sensational defense. Green played sparingly the following season and retired in 1993. John Madden honored Green in his annual All-Madden Team, stating that at one point, he regarded Green as not the best wide receiver in the game, but the best player. Green finished with 559 receptions for 8,965 yards and 66 touchdowns.  He also rushed for 140 yards, returned 27 punts for 230 yards, and added another 2,002 yards on kickoff returns. He also intercepted 4 passes for 54 yards and recovered 20 fumbles. Overall, he gained 11,391 yards and scored 69 touchdowns, with his 62 for the Cardinals being a franchise record.

On October 2, 2016, Green was inducted as the 16th member of the Arizona Cardinals Ring of Honor. On September 15, 2017, Green was inducted into the St. Louis Sports Hall of Fame.

Personal life 
Green married his wife, Sharon, before the 1980 NFL season. Ottis Anderson and Theotis Brown served as groomsmen and his brother, Leotis, was best man.

Since retiring from the NFL, Green has shifted his focus to helping improve the health of current and former professional athletes through promoting sleep apnea awareness across the country. He has teamed up with dental icon, David Gergen, and a company called Pro Player Health Alliance to hold free public awareness events in local communities all over the nation. After joining the cause of Pro Player Health Alliance and using his extensive number of connections to players, he has helped get over 150 former players successfully treated for sleep apnea.

In 2012, Green was diagnosed with kidney disease due to the long-term use of anti-inflammatories during his playing career in the NFL. Following a year of dialysis three days a week, his daughters, Miyosha, 30, and Candace, 26, both offered to donate a kidney to their father.  Both daughters were matches, but Miyosha was chosen to donate. Green had successful surgery on Nov. 14 at the Mayo Clinic.

References

External links
 
 NFL Films Blog This Date In Football: Happy Birthday, Roy Green
 Pro-Football-Reference.com: Roy Green

1957 births
Living people
African-American players of American football
American football wide receivers
American football cornerbacks
American football safeties
American football return specialists
Henderson State Reddies football players
St. Louis Cardinals (football) players
Phoenix Cardinals players
Philadelphia Eagles players
National Conference Pro Bowl players
People from Magnolia, Arkansas
Players of American football from Arkansas
National Football League replacement players
21st-century African-American people
20th-century African-American sportspeople